Poecilasthena character is a moth in the family Geometridae. It is found on Borneo, Peninsular Malaysia and Sumatra.

Adults are white with green fasciation.

References

Moths described in 1932
Poecilasthena
Moths of Asia